Kaye Elhardt (August 28, 1935 – September 1, 2004) was an American actress with dozens of television appearances in a career spanning from 1956 to 1977. She was perhaps best known for her comedic role as Josephine St. Cloud opposite James Garner and Jack Kelly in the 1959 "Pappy" episode of Maverick.

Elhardt played Peaches in the 1958 ABC comedy Love That Jill. She also made more than 40 appearances on television series. Among her three guest appearances on Perry Mason with Raymond Burr, she played defendant Ginny Talbot in the 1962 episode, "The Case of the Borrowed Baby."

She was featured on Family Affair; Highway Patrol with Broderick Crawford; Wagon Train with Ward Bond; Sea Hunt with Lloyd Bridges; seven different roles in 77 Sunset Strip with Efrem Zimbalist, Jr.; Bourbon Street Beat with Andrew Duggan, Richard Long, and Van Williams; Bat Masterson with Gene Barry; My Three Sons with Fred MacMurray; The Tab Hunter Show with Tab Hunter; Surfside Six with Troy Donahue and Van Williams; Hawaiian Eye with Robert Conrad; Bronco; Yancy Derringer with Jock Mahoney; Colt .45; Philip Marlowe with Philip Carey; and more than a score of others.

Select filmography

References

External links
 
 
 New York Times Filmography for Kay Elhardt
 

American television actresses
1935 births
2004 deaths
20th-century American actresses
21st-century American women